Argna is a genus of air-breathing land snails, terrestrial pulmonate gastropod mollusks in the family Argnidae.

Species 
Species within the genus Argna include:

 Argna bielzi (Rossmässler, 1859)
 Argna biplicata (Michaud, 1831)
 Argna bourguignatiana (Nevill, 1880)
 Argna ferrari (Porro, 1838)
 Argna szekeresi A. Reischütz, N. Steiner-Reischütz & P.L. Reischütz, 2016
 Argna thracica Subai, 1999
 Argna valsabina (Spinelli, 1851)

References

 Bank, R. A. (2017). Classification of the Recent terrestrial Gastropoda of the World. Last update: July 16th, 2017

External links 
 
 Cossmann, M. (1889). Gastéropodes. In: Douvillé, H. (Ed.) Revue de paléontologie pour l'année 1888. Annuaire Géologique Universel. 5: 1079–1109
 Wenz, W. (1920). Zur Systematik tertiärer Land- und Süßwassergastropoden. III. Senckenbergiana. 2: 15-19.

Argnidae